= Recycling in Israel =

Recycling in Israel accounts for approximately 20% of waste in that country.

== Relevant legislation ==
The two laws that most directly concern recycling in Israel are the Law to Protect Cleanliness (1984) and the Law for the Collection of Recycling (1993).

=== Law to Protect Cleanliness ===
The Law to Protect Cleanliness:

- bans the disposal of waste in public areas; and
- requires local governments to establish sites for the collection and removal of garbage and recycling; and
- sets fines for acts that violate the provisions of this law; and
- mandates that funds raised from such fines go to a Fund for the Protection of Cleanliness.

=== Law for the Collection of Recycling ===
The Law for the Collection of Recycling:

- calls on local governments to establish areas for the collection and removal of recycling; and
- allows the Minister for the Protection of the Environment to obligate local governments to establish such areas.
